Neoterebra  acrior is a species of sea snail, a marine gastropod mollusk in the family Terebridae, the auger snails.

Description

Distribution
This species occurs in the Caribbean Sea, the Gulf of Mexico and off Puerto Rico.

References

 Rosenberg, G., F. Moretzsohn, and E. F. García. 2009. Gastropoda (Mollusca) of the Gulf of Mexico, Pp. 579–699 in Felder, D.L. and D.K. Camp (eds.), Gulf of Mexico–Origins, Waters, and Biota. Biodiversity. Texas A&M Press, College Station, Texas.
 Terryn Y. (2011) A new species, a lost type and its forgotten name and more terebrid discoveries in the Caribbean (Gastropoda: Terebridae). Novapex 12(3-4): 63–72.
 Garcia, E. F. 2012. Terebra limatula Dall,1889 and T. acrior Dall, 1889 (Gastropoda: Terebridae); two problematic taxa from the western Atlantic. Zootaxa 3328: 66-68

External links
 Fedosov, A. E.; Malcolm, G.; Terryn, Y.; Gorson, J.; Modica, M. V.; Holford, M.; Puillandre, N. (2020). Phylogenetic classification of the family Terebridae (Neogastropoda: Conoidea). Journal of Molluscan Studies

Terebridae
Gastropods described in 1889